Carrigans is a village in The Laggan, a district in the east of County Donegal, Ireland. The village is located on the R236 regional road only a short distance from the River Foyle.

History
Carrigans was at one time the centre of a major flax and linen producing area, possessing one of the largest flax mills in County Donegal, before the demise of the flax industry in the 1950s. Commercial salmon fishing was also a major employer in the past.

Killea (St. Fiach's) Parish Church (Church of Ireland) is in the village of Carrigans. 

Carrigans once had a railway station, the village being served by the Great Northern Railway, which closed in 1965.

The Bangalore torpedo, an explosive device used in many conflicts, was invented by Captain (later Colonel) McClintock, of Dunmore, Carrigans. 

Carrigans was one of several Protestant villages in eastern Donegal that would have been transferred to Northern Ireland, had the recommendations of the Irish Boundary Commission been enacted in 1925.

Notable residents
 Dunmore House, on the edge of the village, was formerly the home of the McClintock dynasty, an Ulster-Scots family. It is now owned by Sir John McFarland, 3rd Bt.
 Sir Jim Starritt, a former Deputy Commissioner of the Metropolitan Police, was born in Carrigans.
 The writer Dame Agatha Christie visited Carrigans on a few occasions, as a guest of the McClintocks of Dunmore, to whom she was related through marriage.

See also
 List of populated places in Ireland

External links
 Official site

References

Towns and villages in County Donegal